Gerald Shea could refer to: 

Gerald Shea (district attorney), American attorney from California
Gerald W. Shea (1931–2015), American politician from Illinois
Gerry Shea (1881–1964), American baseball player

See also
Jerry Shay (born 1944), American football player
Jere Shea (born 1965), American actor
Jerry Shea (1892–1947), Welsh rugby player